Anelaphus magnipunctatus is a species of beetle in the family Cerambycidae. It was described by Knull in 1934.

References

magnipunctatus
Beetles described in 1934